Mission San Fernando Rey de España is a Spanish mission in the Mission Hills community of Los Angeles, California. The mission was founded on 8 September 1797 at the site of Achooykomenga, and was the seventeenth of the twenty-one Spanish missions established in Alta California. Named for Saint Ferdinand, the mission is the namesake of the nearby city of San Fernando and the San Fernando Valley.

The mission was secularized in 1834 and returned to the Catholic Church in 1861; it became a working church in 1920. Today the mission grounds function as a museum; the church is a chapel of ease of the Archdiocese of Los Angeles.

History

In 1769, the Spanish Portolà expedition – the first Europeans to see inland areas of California – traveled north through the San Fernando Valley. On August 7 they camped at a watering place near where the mission would later be established. Fray Juan Crespí, a Franciscan missionary travelling with the expedition, noted in his diary that the camp was "at the foot of the mountains".

Founding 
It is the 17th mission. The Rancho of Francisco Reyes (then the Alcalde of the Pueblo de Los Ángeles), which included the agricultural settlement of Achooykomenga worked by Ventureño Chumash, Fernandeño (Tongva), and Tataviam laborers, was approved by the padres as a suitable site for the Mission. After brief negotiations with the Alcalde, the land was acquired (Mission records list Reyes as godfather to the first infant baptized at San Fernando).

The mission was founded on 8 September 1797 by Father Fermín Lasuén who, with the assistance of Fray Francisco Dumetz and in the presence of troops and natives, performed the ceremonies and dedicated the mission to San Fernando Rey de España, making it the fourth mission site he had established; ten children were baptized on the first day. Fray Francisco Dumetz and his associate Fray Francisco Javier Uría labored in the mission until after 1800.

Early in October 1797, 13 adults were baptised and the first marriage took place on 8 October. At the end of the year, there were 55 neophytes. By 1800, there were 310 neophytes, 352 baptisms, and 70 deaths.

1800s 
Fray Dumetz left the mission in April 1802, then returned in 1804 and finally left the following year at the same time as Fray Francisco Javier Uría, who left the country. In 1805, Fray Nicolás Lázaro and Fray José María Zalvidea arrived at the mission; the latter was transferred to San Gabriel in 1806 and the former died at San Diego in August 1807. An adobe church with a tile roof was blessed in December 1806. Padres José Antonio Uría and Pedro Muños arrived in 1807; the former retired in November 1808 and was succeeded by Fray Martín de Landaeta while Fray José Antonio Urresti arrived in 1809 and became the associate of Fray Muñoz. Fray Landaeta died in 1816.

During the first decade of the century, the neophyte population increased from 310 to 955, there had been 797 deaths, and 1468 baptisms. The largest number of baptisms in any one year was 361 in 1803.

In 1804 there was a land controversy where the padres successfully protested against the granting of the Rancho Camulos to Francisco Ávila.

1810s 
Fray Urresti died in 1812 and was succeeded by Fray Joaquín Pascual Nuez in 1812 to 1814, Fray Vincente Pascual Oliva was stationed in the mission from 1814 to 1815. Fray Pedro Muñoz left California in 1817, and his place was taken by Fray Marcos Antonio de Vitoria from 1818 to 1820. Fray Ramón Ulibarri arrived in January and Fray Francisco González de Ibarra in October 1820. On 21 December 1812, an earthquake hit the area which caused enough damage to necessitate the introduction of 20 new beams to support the church wall. Before 1818, a new chapel was completed. During the period of 1810 to 1820 the population increased slightly, reaching its highest figure, 1,080, in 1819, after which its decline began.

1820s 
After Fray Ulibarri died in 1821, Fray Francisco González de Ibarra was stationed alone in the mission.

Beginning of the Mexican era 
After the Mexican Empire gained independence from Spain on 27 September 1821, the Province of Alta California became the Mexican Territory of Alta California. The missions continued under the rule of Mexico.

Fray Ibarra began to complain that the soldiers of his guard were causing problems by selling liquor and lending horses to the natives and in 1825, he declared that "the presidio was a curse rather than a help to the mission, that the soldiers should go to work and raise grain, and not live on the toil of the Indians, whom they robbed and deceived with talk of liberty while in reality they treated them as slaves." This led to a sharp reply from Captain Guerra, who advised the Padre to modify his tone. The amount of supplies furnished by the mission to the presidio from 1822 to April 1827 amounted to $21,203.

1830s 
Fray Ibarra continued his labors alone until the middle of 1835 when he retired to Mexico. His successor was Fray Pedro Cabot from San Antonio who was stationed until his death in October 1836. After Fray Cabot's death, there is no mention of a missionary at San Fernando until August 1838 when Fray Blas Ordaz remained there during the rest of the decade. Down to 1834, the neophyte population decreased by less than 100 and the mission remained productive.

Secularization 
In October 1834, Comisionado Antonio del Valle took charge of the mission estates by inventory from Fray Ibarra. From then, the mission was to be a parish of the second class with a $1000 salary.

Later history 
In 1842, six years before the California Gold Rush, a brother of the mission mayordomo (foreman) made the first Alta California gold discovery in the foothills near the mission. In memory of that discovery, the place was given the name Placerita Canyon, but only small quantities of gold were found.

In 1845, Governor Pío Pico declared the Mission buildings for sale under the Mexican secularization act of 1833 and, in 1846, made Mission San Fernando Rey de España de velicata his headquarters as Rancho Ex-Mission San Fernando. The Mission was utilized in a number of ways during the late 19th century: north of the mission was the site of Lopez Station for the Butterfield Stage Lines; it served as a warehouse for the Porter Land and Water Company; and in 1896, the quadrangle was used as a hog farm. In 1861, the Mission buildings and 75 acres of land were returned to the church after Charles Fletcher Lummis acted for preservation. The buildings were disintegrating as beams, tiles and nails were taken from the church by settlers. San Fernando's church became a working church again in 1923 when the Oblate priests arrived. Many attempts were made to restore the old Mission from the early 20th century, but it was not until the Hearst Foundation gave a large gift of money in the 1940s, that the Mission was finally restored. The museum became the repository for heirlooms of the Mexican church evacuated during the Cristero revolt, and also holds part of the Doheny library. The church was listed on the National Register of Historic Places in 1971, but was extensively damaged by the 1971 San Fernando earthquake, and was completely rebuilt. Repairs were completed in 1974. It continues to be very well cared for and is still used as a chapel-of-ease. The Convento Building was separately listed on the Register in 1988. In 2003, comedian Bob Hope, a late-life convert to Catholicism, was interred in the Bob Hope Memorial Gardens; followed by his widow Dolores Hope in 2011.

Mission industries
The goals of the missions were, first, to spread the message of Christianity and, second, to establish a Spanish colony. Because of the difficulty of delivering supplies by sea, the missions had to become self-sufficient in relatively short order. Toward that end, neophytes were taught European-style farming, animal husbandry, mechanical arts and domestic crafts like tallow candle making.

Mission bells
Bells were vitally important to daily life at any mission. The bells were rung at mealtimes, to call the Mission residents to work and to religious services, during births and funerals, to signal the approach of a ship or returning missionary, and at other times; novices were instructed in the intricate rituals associated with the ringing the mission bell. The residents as referred to above were called neophytes  (Indigenous persons) after baptism. There were five bells at the mission from 1769 to 1931.

A hundred-pound bell was unearthed in an orange grove near the Mission in 1920. It carried the following inscription (translated from Russian): "In the Year 1796, in the month of January, this bell was cast on the Island of Kodiak by the blessing of Archimandrite Joaseph, during the sojourn of Alexsandr Baranov." It is not known how this Russian Orthodox artifact from Kodiak, Alaska made its way to a Catholic mission in Southern California.

Gallery

See also
 Convento Building (Mission San Fernando)
 List of Spanish missions in California
 List of Los Angeles Historic-Cultural Monuments in the San Fernando Valley
 Rancho Ex-Mission San Fernando
 San Fernando Mission Cemetery
 Spanish missions in California
 USNS Mission San Fernando (AO-122) – a Mission Buenaventura (AO‑111) Class fleet oiler built during World War I
Casa De San Pedro served mission in past
Chatsworth Calera owned by mission in past

Notes

References

More information

External links

 
 Early photographs, sketches, land surveys of Mission San Fernando Rey de España, via Calisphere, California Digital Library
 Listing, photographs, and drawings of church at the Historic American Buildings Survey
 Listing and photographs of fountains at the Historic American Buildings Survey
 Listing, photographs, and drawings of monastery at the Historic American Buildings Survey
 

San Fernando Rey de Espana
1797 in Alta California
Roman Catholic churches in Los Angeles
Museums in Los Angeles
History museums in California
Religious museums in California
History of the San Fernando Valley
Roman Catholic churches completed in 1797
18th-century Roman Catholic church buildings in the United States
1797 establishments in Alta California
Roman Catholic Archdiocese of Los Angeles
California Historical Landmarks
Los Angeles Historic-Cultural Monuments
Churches on the National Register of Historic Places in California
History of Los Angeles
History of Los Angeles County, California
Roman Catholic churches in California
Buildings and structures in the San Fernando Valley
Arcades (architecture)
El Camino Viejo
Lopez Station
Mission Hills, Los Angeles
National Register of Historic Places in Los Angeles